Leah Lail is a retired American actress, best known for her role as Kay Simmons the communications and systems expert on the syndicated television series V.I.P..

Early life
Lail graduated summa cum laude from the University of Southern California.

Career
She also guest starred in the television series Seinfeld; Empty Nest; Matlock; The Larry Sanders Show; ER; 7th Heaven; Diagnosis: Murder; Touched by an Angel; Providence; Yes, Dear; Without a Trace and Boston Legal, her last acting credit. Lail also had a recurring role as Debbie in the sitcom The Jackie Thomas Show, starring Tom Arnold. Her film credits include D2: The Mighty Ducks, Heavyweights, Late Last Night and Little Nicky. She also played the female lead in the film Denial, opposite Jonathan Silverman.

Lail has since retired from acting and now works as a real estate agent in Beverly Hills, California.

Filmography

References

External links

20th-century American actresses
21st-century American actresses
Actors from Lexington, Kentucky
American film actresses
American real estate brokers
American television actresses
University of Southern California alumni
Living people
Year of birth missing (living people)
Actresses from Kentucky